Cheba Maria is a singer from Casablanca, Morocco.

In 1998, Cheba Maria moved to Toulouse  (France) looking for new opportunities and musical experiences.

Discography 
1998: her duet with Cheb Rachid, " Enta Ould Bladi " ( Out of my country ) has sold several thousand copies of many countries, such as Morocco.
1999: " Amalek Zine" ( What is it? ) .
2000: " Zinek Khater " (  Your beauty is irresistible ) .
2001: " Rani Mghamra " ( First  part of the adventure ) .
2003: "Jenentinie" (You make me crazy) and her participation in the album "Fever Raï'n'B", The "Mon Bled" duet with Mohamed Lamine and Rohff sold more than 250.000 copies, this give more opportunities to Cheba in her career.
2005: " My Love"
2008: " Ould Bladi "
2012: " Atlas Lions"
2013: "Princess Sara " with "Psy 4 Rime"  from the album  "4D"

References

External links 
 Biography

21st-century Moroccan women singers
Living people
Year of birth missing (living people)
20th-century Moroccan women singers